Red letter is an English language idiom that may refer to:
A red letter day, an important occasion, festival, or anniversary
A red letter edition, usually of the Bible, with portions of the text written in red ink
Red-Letter Christians, a movement named for the words attributed to Jesus in red letter editions of the Bible